The following is a list of Radio Disney Music Award winners and nominees for Best Music Video (formerly Video That Rocks).

Winners and nominees

2000s

2010s

References

Video
American music video awards